Nico Karger (born 1 February 1993) is a German footballer who plays as a forward for FC Deisenhofen.

Career statistics

References

External links
 

1993 births
Living people
People from Kronach (district)
Sportspeople from Upper Franconia
German footballers
Footballers from Bavaria
Association football forwards
2. Bundesliga players
3. Liga players
Regionalliga players
TSV 1860 Munich II players
TSV 1860 Munich players
SV Elversberg players